This article compares early word processing software.

Operating system compatibility
This table gives a comparison of what operating systems are compatible with each word processor in 1985.

References

Word processors, early

Word processors, early